The 2019 FIU Panthers football team represented Florida International University (FIU) in the 2019 NCAA Division I FBS football season. The Panthers played their home games at Riccardo Silva Stadium in Miami, Florida, (except for the November 23rd game against UM which was played at Miami Marlins Park) and competed in the East Division of Conference USA (C-USA). They were led by third-year head coach Butch Davis.

Preseason

CUSA media poll
Conference USA released their preseason media poll on July 16, 2019, with the Panthers predicted to finish in second place in the East Division.

Preseason All-CUSA teams
To be released

Schedule
FIU announced its 2019 football schedule on January 10, 2019. The 2019 schedule consists of 7 home and 5 away games in the regular season.

Schedule Source:

Game summaries

at Tulane

Western Kentucky

New Hampshire

at Louisiana Tech

UMass

Charlotte

UTEP

at Middle Tennessee

Old Dominion

at Florida Atlantic

Miami (FL)

at Marshall

vs. Arkansas State (Camellia Bowl)

Players drafted into the NFL

References

FIU
FIU Panthers football seasons
FIU Panthers football